A potluck is a communal gathering where each guest or group contributes a different, often homemade, dish of food to be shared.

Other names for a "potluck" include: potluck dinner, pitch-in, shared lunch, spread, faith supper, carry-in dinner, covered-dish-supper, fuddle, Jacob's Join, bring a plate, and fellowship meal.

Etymology 
The word pot-luck appears in the 16th-century English work of Thomas Nashe, and used to mean "food provided for an unexpected or uninvited guest, the luck of the pot". The modern execution of a "communal meal, where guests bring their own food", most likely originated in the 1930s during the Great Depression.

Some speakers believe that it is an eggcorn of the North American indigenous communal meal known as a potlatch (meaning "to give away").

Description 
Potluck dinners are events where the attendees bring a dish to a meal. Potluck dinners are often organized by religious or community groups, since they simplify the meal planning and distribute the costs among the participants. Smaller, more informal get-togethers with distributed food preparation may also be called potlucks. The only traditional rule is that each dish be large enough to be shared among a good portion (but not necessarily all) of the anticipated guests. In some cases each participant agrees ahead of time to bring a single course, and the result is a multi-course meal. This agreement rectifies the problem of many participants bringing the same dish. Guests may bring in any form of food, ranging from the main course to desserts.

See also

 Buffet
 Free lunch
 House concert
 Pampa mesa

References

External links

 What's the origin of "potluck"?

Eating parties
Food combinations
Serving and dining
Eggcorns
Communal eating